Hell's Kitchen, Manhattan is a neighborhood in New York City.

Hell's Kitchen may also refer to:

Films
 For the Love of Mike or Hell's Kitchen, a 1927 film by Frank Capra
 Tenth Avenue (film) or Hell's Kitchen, a 1928 American film
 Hell's Kitchen (1939 film), a film starring the Dead End Kids and Ronald Reagan
 Víctimas del Pecado or Hell's Kitchen, a 1951 film by Emilio Fernández
 Hell's Kitchen, a 1962 Japanese film by Umetsugu Inoue
 Hell's Kitchen (1998 film), a film featuring Angelina Jolie

Music
 Hell's Kitchen (band), an American speed metal/punk band
 Hell's Kitchen (Andre Nickatina album) or its title song
 Hell's Kitchen (Leslie Spit Treeo album)
 Hell's Kitchen (Maxim album) or its title song
 Hell's Kitchen, an album by Jazzkantine
 "Hell's Kitchen", a song by Dream Theater from Falling into Infinity

Television
 Hell's Kitchen (British TV series), a cooking-based reality show 
 Hell's Kitchen (American TV series), an American version of the UK show
 Hell's Kitchen (Finnish TV series), a Finnish version of the UK show
 Hell's Kitchen Australia, an Australian version of the UK show
 Hell's Kitchen Italia, an Italian version of the UK show
 Hell's Kitchen Albania, an Albanian version of the UK show

Other uses
 Hell's Kitchen (novel), a novel by Jeffrey Deaver
 Hell's Kitchen (painting), a 19th-century oil painting of Newcastle upon Tyne eccentrics
 Hell's Kitchen (restaurant), a chain of restaurants from Gordon Ramsay, inspired by his American reality TV show